Gadsby may refer to:

Gadsby (surname)
Gadsby (novel), a 1939 novel by Ernest Vincent Wright, about its primary character John Gadsby without the letter 'E'
Gadsby, Alberta, a small village in east central Alberta, Canada
 W Gadsby & Son Ltd, a UK supplier of wicker baskets and gift packaging

See also
Gatsby (disambiguation)